The 2012 Hamilton Tiger-Cats season was the 55th season for the team in the Canadian Football League and their 63rd overall. The Tiger-Cats finished in 4th place in the East Division with a 6–12 record and missed the playoffs for the first time since 2008; this was despite the fact that the team scored more points in the 2012 season than any other CFL team (offset by the fact that they also gave up more points than any other CFL team).

Offseason

CFL Draft
The 2012 CFL Draft took place on May 3, 2012 live at 3:00 PM EDT. The Tiger-Cats had seven selections in the six-round draft, including an additional third-round pick from the Arland Bruce trade.

Preseason

Regular season

Season standings

Season schedule

Roster

Coaching staff

References

Hamilton Tiger-Cats seasons
Ham